The B-NL Challenge Trophy is a golf tournament on the Challenge Tour, played in the Netherlands and Belgium alternating years. 

Supported by the Netherlands Golf Federation (NGF) and the Royal Belgian Golf Federation (KBGF), the tournament will be hosted in the Netherlands 2021 and 2023, and in Belgium 2022 and 2024, following the cancellation of the 2020 event due to the COVID-19 pandemic.

It succeeded the Belgian tournament the KPMG Trophy on the Challenge tour schedule, and marks the first return of the tour to the Netherlands since the Dutch Futures in 2009.

Winners

References

External links
Coverage on the Challenge Tour's official site

Challenge Tour events
Golf tournaments in the Netherlands
Golf tournaments in Belgium
Recurring sporting events established in 2020